General elections were held in Saint Lucia on 6 June 2016. The result was a victory for the United Workers Party, which won eleven of the seventeen seats. On 7 June 2016 United Workers Party leader Allen Chastanet was sworn in as Prime Minister.

Electoral system

The 17 elected members of the House of Assembly were elected by first-past-the-post voting in single member constituencies. Following the elections, a Speaker is elected, who may be from outside the House.

Campaign
The opposition United Workers Party announced it would be fielding a full slate of 17 candidates. The ruling Labour Party campaign included 15 pledges to voters.

Results

By constituency

References

External links
Saint Lucia Electoral Department

Saint Lucia
2016 in Saint Lucia
Elections in Saint Lucia
June 2016 events in North America